Paula Kilvington (born 1957) is a former English badminton international player and a former national champion.

Biography
Kilvington became an English National doubles champion after winning the English National Badminton Championships women's doubles title with Gillian Gilks in 1984. She had previously finished runner-up in the doubles in 1982 and was an English junior champion in 1975. She represented Yorkshire and also won the 1979 Hungarian International.

References 

English female badminton players
1957 births
Living people